Øystein Slettemark (born 20 August 1967) is a Greenlandic biathlete.

Career
Slettemark competed in the 2010 Winter Olympics for Denmark. His best performance was 86th in the sprint. He also finished 88th in the individual.

At IBU events, Slettemark represents Greenland, which does not have its own National Olympic Committee. He is married to Uiloq Slettemark who is also a biathlete. Between the two of them they have competed about thirty times in the Arctic Circle Race winning a large number of medals. Uiloq said that she had 14 medals and she might have obtained 15 if she had not been seven months pregnant whilst competing.

As of February 2013, his best performance at the Biathlon World Championships is 77th, in the 2007 sprint.

As of February 2013, his best Biathlon World Cup finish is 49th, in the individual at Fort Kent in 2003/04.

References

External links
 

1967 births
Biathletes at the 2010 Winter Olympics
Danish male biathletes
Greenlandic biathletes
Living people
Olympic biathletes of Denmark
Sportspeople from Rio de Janeiro (city)
Danish male cross-country skiers